The 13th TCA Awards were presented by the Television Critics Association. Drew Carey hosted the ceremony on July 20, 1997, at the Huntington Hotel and Spa in Pasadena, Calif.

Winners and nominees

Multiple wins 
The following shows received multiple wins:

Multiple nominations 
The following shows received multiple nominations:

References

External links 
 Official website 
 1997 TCA Awards at IMDb.com

1997 television awards
1997 in American television
TCA Awards ceremonies